Park Tae-hyeong  (born April 7, 1992) is a South Korean footballer who plays as a centre back.

Honour
Nongbua Pitchaya
 Thai League 2 Champions : 2020–21

External links 

1992 births
Living people
Association football defenders
South Korean footballers
South Korean expatriate footballers
Park Tae-hyeong
Expatriate footballers in Thailand
South Korean expatriate sportspeople in Thailand
Dankook University alumni